Cristian Costin Dănălache (born 15 July 1982) is a Romanian professional football coach and former football player.

Club career
Dănălache began his career with Liga III club CS Otopeni in the 2003–04 season. He helped the club win promotion to the Second Division at the end of the season. In 2006, he transferred to UTA Arad, where he got his first taste of Liga I football, before signing for Unirea Urziceni. After two and a half years with the club, Dănălache won the 2008–09 Liga I championship.

In 2010, he agreed to short-term deals in Israel and Saudi Arabia.

Jiangsu Sainty
Before the 2011 season, the scouters of Jiangsu Sainty observed Dănălache a couple of times at the Turkish training camp. On 21 March 2011 Jiangsu Sainty formally announced the signing of the Romanian striker.
 
During his first months at Jiangsu Sainty, Dănălache didn't adapt well to life in his new surroundings. His game form finally began to rise under manager Dragan Okuka, who signed with Jiangsu in May. Dănălache got his first goal for the club on 29 May 2011, against Guizhou Renhe when he scored the winning goal to take a 1–0 victory.

League One
On 28 February 2014, Dănălache transferred to China League One side Qingdao Jonoon . In February 2015, Dănălache transferred to fellow China League One side Xinjiang Tianshan Leopard.

On 20 January 2016, Dănălache joined K League 2 side Gyeongnam FC.

Career statistics

Honours

Club
Unirea Urziceni
Romanian League: 2008–09
Romanian Cup Runner-up: 2007–08

Jiangsu Sainty
Chinese Super League Runner-up: 2012

Individual
Chinese Football Association Footballer of the Year: 2012
Chinese Super League Golden Boot winner: 2012
Chinese Super League Team of the Year: 2012

References

External links

Footballers from Bucharest
1982 births
Living people
Romanian footballers
FC Unirea Urziceni players
CS Otopeni players
FC UTA Arad players
Liga I players
Ettifaq FC players
Bnei Sakhnin F.C. players
Jiangsu F.C. players
Qingdao Hainiu F.C. (1990) players
Xinjiang Tianshan Leopard F.C. players
Gyeongnam FC players
Daejeon Hana Citizen FC players
Liga II players
CS Sportul Snagov players
Romanian expatriate footballers
Romanian expatriate sportspeople in Saudi Arabia
Romanian expatriate sportspeople in Israel
Romanian expatriate sportspeople in China
Romanian expatriate sportspeople in South Korea
Expatriate footballers in Saudi Arabia
Expatriate footballers in Israel
Expatriate footballers in China
Expatriate footballers in South Korea
Association football forwards
Israeli Premier League players
Chinese Super League players
China League One players
K League 2 players
Saudi Professional League players
Romanian football managers